Edward Vernon Moore (11 May 1895 – 4 June 1955) was an Australian rules footballer who played with Melbourne and Richmond in the Victorian Football League (VFL).

Notes

External links 

1895 births
1955 deaths
Australian rules footballers from Melbourne
Melbourne Football Club players
Richmond Football Club players
People from St Kilda, Victoria